CSM Dunărea Galaţi is an ice hockey club in Galați, Romania that plays in the Romanian Hockey League. It was established in 1932 under the name "Gloria C.S.U." Their home rink is the Galați Skating Rink. CSM Dunărea has won the Romanian Hockey league championship two times in a row.

Achievements
National League:
Winners (2): 2014–15, 2015–16
Romanian Cup:
Winners (2): 1988, 2017

References

External links
EuroHockey profile

Ice hockey teams in Romania
Sport in Galați
1932 establishments in Romania
Ice hockey clubs established in 1932